The 1989–90 A Group was the 42nd season of the A Football Group, the top Bulgarian professional league for association football clubs, since its establishment in 1948. The campaign was won by CSKA Sofia, nine points ahead of Slavia Sofia. Hebar Pazardzhik, Cherno More Varna and Botev Vratsa were relegated.

Teams

Stadiums and locations

Personnel

League standings

Results

Champions
CSKA Sofia

Penev left the club during a season.

Top scorers

References
Bulgaria - List of final tables (RSSSF)

First Professional Football League (Bulgaria) seasons
Bulgaria
1